Giv'at Halfon Eina Ona (lit: "Halfon Hill Doesn't Answer"), also titled Giv'at Halfon, is a cult Israeli comedy film produced in 1976. It is a good-hearted satire of the Israel Defense Forces which tells the story of a reserves company, watching the Egyptian border in Sinai. Characters such as the conman Sergio Constanza, the Egyptian-born Mr. Hasson, and the huge cook Yosifoun became classics.

The name of the film is a parody of the name of the Israeli patriotic film Giv'a 24 Eina Ona (Hill 24 Doesn't Answer).

The film was directed by Assi Dayan and stars members of HaGashash HaHiver: Shaike Levi, Yisrael Poliakov, and Gavri Banai.

Plot
Staff Sgt. Raphael "Gingy" Moked is ordered by his company commander, Captain Shamgar, to retrieve Sergio Constanza, a deserter from reserve service. On his way he meets his girlfriend Yaeli and offers to talk to her father, Victor Hasson, to get a blessing for their relationship. Hasson gives his blessing, believing that Moked came for his older daughter Shifra, but throws him out of the house after finding out this was not so. Yaeli does not wish to part from Moked, and sneaks into a suitcase in his jeep. Meanwhile, Constanza tricks several other gamblers into losing thousands of dollars, which he intends to use to repay a debt to Mr. Hasson. The gamblers find out about the plot however, which leaves Sergio with no choice but to run away to the army with Moked.

Moked and Constanza make it to a military camp in the Sinai, and Mr. Hasson follows them, posing as Constanza at the gate to get admission. When he is not allowed into the base, he steals a front loader to break in. Meanwhile, Moked finds out that Yaeli came with them, and Constanza comes up with a plot to make her an authorized visitor, by claiming that she is a singer/entertainer sent from the Education Corps. Mr. Hasson arrives at the base with the loader, and is caught by the soldiers in a fishing net. Shamgar reports the incident to the brigadier. Shamgar then meets with Yaeli, who calls herself "Bule-Bule", in private and they start dancing African dances half-nude, as she attempts to persuade him that she's an entertainer.

As the brigadier is about to arrive, Moked releases Mr. Hasson, who is forced to temporarily reconcile with Constanza. The brigadier finds Shamgar dancing alone and making noises, deems him insane, and takes him away in his helicopter, leaving Moked temporarily in command of the outpost.  It is discovered that Mr. Hasson is an excellent cook. He transforms the military kitchen into a restaurant-like establishment, and then denies Constanza access. In revenge, Constanza tricks Hasson into buying a plot of nearby desert land, which Hasson believes to be an oil field, from him as payment of the debt.

Constanza then tries to help Moked by matching one of the soldiers, Wasserman, with Yaeli's older sister, Shifra. But when Shifra arrives at the base, she isn't impressed with Wasserman, but falls in love with Constanza instead. Hasson leaves the base to catch fish for the soldiers' dinners, but accidentally crosses the border into Egypt and is taken captive by an Egyptian patrol. While in captivity, Victor becomes friends with the Egyptian commanding officer, who grew up in the same area as him. In the meantime, the Israeli soldiers plan a rescue mission to return the captured Hasson. Although the mission, dubbed "Operation Waldheim" doesn't go as planned, Gingy and Constanza, posing as UN observers, succeed in returning Hasson and returning him to the base.

When Hasson returns to the base, he discovers that Sergio had conned him once again, and that the plot of land he bought from him wasn't really an oil field at all. Out of nowhere, Capt. Shamgar reappears, still searching for "Bule-Bule". He falls into a pit dug by Hasson on the plot of land, causing an oil geyser to appear and revealing the presence of oil in the land after all. The film ends with Hasson, Moked and Constanza, now his sons-in-law, selling the oil from the back of a truck in Tel Aviv, early in the morning.

Cast
 Staff Sgt. Raphael "Gingy" Moked (Gavri Banai) - an IDF non-commissioned officer, in love with Mr. Hasson's younger daughter Yaeli. Sent to retrieve the absentee Sergio Constanza and bring him to do his reserve service.
 Sergio Constanza (Yisrael Poliakov) - a Romanian-born conman, who has repeatedly failed to report for reserve duty. He leaves with Gingy for the Sinai in order to escape a several thousand-dollar debt to Mr. Hasson and other gamblers in Tel Aviv. Sergio is a charming, funny crook, cunning and manipulative.
 Victor Hasson (Shaike Levi) - a wealthy Egyptian Jew, who immigrated to Israel and now lives in Tel Aviv with his two daughters, and is determined to get the older daughter, Shifra, married. He pursues Sergio into the Sinai in order to collect a large debt. The scene where Hasson lifts Sergio's field-toilet cabin with a loader-bulldozer became a classic.
 Yaeli Hasson (Nitza Shaul) - Mr Hasson's younger daughter and Gingy's girlfriend. They want to get married but Mr. Hasson refuses his consent until he can marry off his older daughter, Shifra. Following Hasson's refusal, Yaeli sneaks into Gingy's jeep and finds herself in the Sinai base.
 Shifra Hasson (Miki Kam) - Mr. Hasson's older daughter.
 Yosifoun (Moshe Ish Kasit) - the big, strong, but inept cook in the Sinai base.
 Capt. Shamgar (Tuvia Tzafir) - the horny company commander of the Sinai post.

The film also features Hana Laszlo, Oshik Levi and Reuven Adiv

References

External links
"Giv'at Halfon Eina Ona" - The full film is available on VOD on the website for the Israel Film Archive - Jerusalem Cinematheque

1976 films
1976 comedy films
Films directed by Assi Dayan
1970s Hebrew-language films
Films about the Israel Defense Forces
Israeli comedy films
Films set in Egypt
Films set in Israel
Military humor in film
Sinai Peninsula